The Vespa P/PX Series is a range of scooters manufactured by Piaggio under the Vespa brand.

History

The Vespa PX was first presented in 1977 in Milan as the nuova linea model (new line). The Vespa was built with two drum brakes, a single-cylinder air cooled engine (aluminum head) and a steel chassis, but has been improved with a new front suspension and a revised rear axle for more stability. It was distributed as Vespa P 125 X and as Vespa P 200 E with an electronic ignition (E for Elettronica) and since 1978 as Vespa P 150 X. The PX 80 appeared in 1981 exclusively for the German market.

This electronic ignition was introduced to the other models, which then were called Vespa PX125E and Vespa PX150E, and in 1982 the Vespa P 200 E was called Vespa PX200E. In 1982, the Arcobaleno series was introduced (marketed outside of Italy as the Lusso series) with technological innovations such as separate lubrication and fuel gauges. In addition, the front brake pads were made to be self-centering, the wiring was altered for ease of maintenance, the same key was now used for the ignition and the steering lock, and several minor adjustments were made to the body. These included increasing the size of the glovebox, increasing the size of the rear mudguard, and a new horn grille.

In 1985 a sporty variant hit the market: The Vespa T5 Pole Position with almost 12 hp. In 1992, coinciding with the 50th anniversary of Vespa, a scooter was offered with the T5 engine and the PX style body. This was marketed as the Vespa PX 125 T5 Classic.

In 2007, the production of the Vespa PX was stopped and the last were sold as Ultima Serie (last series), a limited edition with a windshield, a luggage carrier in chrome and chrome wheels with whitewall tires. In 2010, the Vespa PX returned with a catalytic converter added to the two-stroke engine to meet the Euro 3 emission standards.

A final model called the '70th Anniversary' was produced and when the last stock was sold no more 2 stroke PXs were to be produced; Only the paint and seat differentiate it from the standard PX ZAPM74200 introduced in 2011.

Production of the PX ended in early 2017 as the PX engine failed to meet Euro 4 compliance emission requirements.

Modifications

Owners often modify the PX and similar classic models with bigger engine kits and various parts upgrades. Many companies like Polini, Pinasco and Malossi make an array of aftermarket parts starting from suspension, exhaust to engine casing/kits. These upgrades can increase the performance of the PX and similar models significantly. 

PX125 and PX150 models are often upgraded with 177cc engine kits and PX200 models are often upgraded to 210cc or 215cc. These upgrades are often complemented with a bigger carburetor, high flow fuel taps, and engine casing modification (ex. modifying a rotary valve case to accept a reed valve). Suspension, lighting, other performance modifications, and cosmetic add-ons are also popular and commonly available through many specialized online retailers.

Comparison of Various P Series Models

 The same chassis number applies to the Arcobaleno (or Lusso) models.
 This model was in production from 1985 and marketed exclusively in Germany.

Notes

Motor scooters
Piaggio Vespa